The Good Times is a collection of short stories by the Scottish writer James Kelman published in 1998.

References

Short story collections by James Kelman
1998 short story collections
Scottish short story collections
Secker & Warburg books